Joaquim Pedro Cruz (born 9 December 1966) is a Mozambican former backstroke and medley swimmer. He competed at the 1980 Summer Olympics and the 1984 Summer Olympics.

References

External links
 

1966 births
Living people
People from Niassa Province
Mozambican male backstroke swimmers
Mozambican male medley swimmers
Olympic swimmers of Mozambique
Swimmers at the 1980 Summer Olympics
Swimmers at the 1984 Summer Olympics